Tutti i colori del silenzio (in English: All the Colors of Silence) is a live studio album by Damo Suzuki's Network which was recorded in 2006. The live album is their unique performance recorded in Italy. This album is the first co-production of Palustre Records and Wallace records.

Track listing
1. "Tutti i colori del silenzio" - 46:50

Personnel 
Damo Suzuki - Voice
Xabier Iriondo - Electric guitar and mahai metak
Mattia Coletti - Electric guitar
Diego Sapignoli - Drum, percussions
Andrea Belfi - Electronics

External links 
 
Palustre Records catalog
 Reviews from Wallace Records dot com (PDF 27Kb)

2006 live albums